Paris is a 2008 French film by Cédric Klapisch concerning a diverse group of people living in Paris. The film began shooting in November 2006 and was released in February 2008. Its UK release was in July 2008.  Commentators have noted the similarity in style of this film to Woody Allen's Manhattan and Robert Altman's Short Cuts.

Plot
The film is set principally in Paris, with one thread of the story set in Africa. Over the course of several months, various stories are intertwined, with different characters and plot threads intersecting.
 Pierre is a cabaret dancer who learns from a cardiologist that he has a severe heart condition. The only potential cure is a heart transplant. Unable to dance any more, he retires to his apartment, and waits to hear if a donor becomes available. He becomes reflective on his condition and his past life. He watches old film of him as a dancer on stage, and calls an old girlfriend from his school days. He refuses to tell his parents of his medical condition. When he is able to leave the apartment, he notices several attractive young women, including Khadija and Laetitia.
 Élise, Pierre's sister, is a social worker, divorced with three children. One of the clients who visits the office is Mourad, a Cameroonian immigrant with a family who is trying to get paperwork to authorize entry of his brother, Benoit, into France. Her office is on the brink of union contract negotiations, where her presence is needed. However, when she learns of Pierre's heart condition, she asks to go on part-time status, which bothers her co-workers. She sets up house in Pierre's apartment and begins to take care of him. She holds a party for Pierre at one point to try to cheer him up. She also reflects on her single status and her attitudes toward men.
 Roland Verneuil is an academic at the Sorbonne and expert on the history of Paris who is envious of the seemingly "normal" life of his brother Philippe and his sister-in-law Mélanie. Roland is afraid of winding up like his mentor Professor Vignard, alone and totally absorbed in esoteric topics that are of no interest to the general public. The television producer Arthur Delamare offers Roland the chance to host and narrate a popular TV series about Paris, with the offer of a financially generous contract. Against his past inclinations, Roland accepts the offer. Roland also finds himself attracted to a student in his class, Laetitia, and begins to send her anonymous cell-phone text messages expressing his attraction to her.
 Jean is a vegetable market vendor who is separated from Caroline, another market worker. Caroline is about to leave the market and find work elsewhere, but tension still exists between the two. A lover of motorcycles, Caroline develops a budding relationship with another market employee who is also another motorcycle rider. Jean notices Élise as she shops at the market with her children, and develops an attraction to her.
 Philippe Verneuil is a successful architect whose wife Mélanie is pregnant with their first child. The first scene with Philippe and Roland is set at the funeral of their father. Philippe appears to have a content life with Mélanie, but he begins to have nightmares related to the major architectural project of a new urban center in Paris.
 Khadija, a student of North African background, tries to find work and eventually finds employment in a bakery, whose owner expresses prejudiced sentiments, but who likes Khajida nonetheless because she is a hard worker. Pierre notices Khadija when he shops at the bakery.
 Laetitia, a student at the Sorbonne, begins a relationship with a fellow student. She has an apartment across the street from where Pierre lives. Élise poses as a survey taker to gain entry into Laetitia's apartment to learn if she has a boyfriend, with the idea of pairing her up with Pierre. When Laetitia begins receiving anonymous text-messages expressing an interest in her, she does not know who is sending them, but eventually learns the identity of the sender, who turns out to be Roland Verneuil.
 In Cameroon, Benoit works at a resort hotel. He has made an acquaintance with Marjolaine, a Parisian model, who tells him to contact her if he ever gets to Paris. His brother, Mourad, has mailed him postcards of Paris. Inspired, and in spite of not having the legal paperwork to immigrate to France, Benoit begins the long journey to make his way to Paris, by bus and eventually by an illegal boat crossing across the Straits of Gibraltar.

Cast

 Juliette Binoche (Élise)
 Romain Duris (Pierre)
 Fabrice Luchini (Roland Verneuil)
 Albert Dupontel (Jean)
 François Cluzet (Philippe Verneuil)
 Karin Viard (The bakery manager)
 Mélanie Laurent (Laetitia)
 Gilles Lellouche (Franky)
 Zinedine Soualem (Mourad)
 Julie Ferrier (Caroline)
 Judith El Zein (Mélanie Verneuil)
 Sabrina Ouazani (Khadija)
 Kingsley Kum Abang (Benoit)
 Olivia Bonamy (Diane)
 Audrey Lamy (Fleurist)
 Anne Benoît (Suzini)
 Maurice Bénichou (psychiatrist)
 Audrey Marnay (Marjolaine)
 Emmanuel Quatra (Grand Nanar)
 Annelise Hesme (Victoire)
 Xavier Robic (Arthur Delamare)
 Renée Le Calm (Madame Renée)
 Hubert Saint-Macary (cardiologist)
 Joseph Malerba (taxi driver)
 Jean-Pierre Moulin (Professor Vignard)
 Joffrey Platel (Rémy)
 Farida Khelfa (Farida)
 Suzanne Von Aichinger (Susy, 'Miss Bidoche')
 Marie Drion (Lila, Elise's daughter)
 Iris Grillet (Simone, Elise's daughter)
 Arthur Dujardin (Jules, Elise's son)
 Lila Perrin-Orsini (bakery employee)
 Lorenzo Larocca (accordionist)
 Frederic Rose (TV producer)
 Frederic Cuif (homeless man in tracksuit)
 Alexia Doucet (Lauryn, Caroline and Jean's daughter)
 Georges Huppy (Benoit's brother)
 Jeanne Candel (disabled girl)
 Nelly Antignac (Rachel)
 Juliette Navis (Virginie)
 Samuel Achache (Sorbonne student)
 Luciane de Vogue (bakery customer)
 Sandy Boizard (bakery customer)
 Jerome Michaud-Lariviere (Baudelaire in TV production)
 Catherine Pello (bakery customer)
 Chloé Grillet (architect's child)
 Pablo Klapisch (architect's child)
 Thaïs Klapisch (architect's child)
 Julia Urtado (architect's teenage child)
 Samuel Urtado (architect's teenage child)
 Juliette Prier (architect's teenage child)
 Franck Henry (bar customer)
 Paolo Coccina, Daniel Delannoy, Jean-Jacques Cirillo (bar band musicians)
 Jeanne Cellard (old woman at market)
 Amine Naji (Moroccan boatman)
 Charlotte Corman (Patricia)
 Gerard Dufraisse (butcher)
 Jeremy Bardeau (Diane's friend)
 Cédric Klapisch (man on the roof; uncredited)

Reception
The film won the Radio-Canada Audience Award at the 2009 edition of the Cinéfranco film festival.

Soundtrack

The soundtrack for the film featured songs from the film along with the original music credited to Kraked Unit, mostly written by Robert Burke and Loïc Dury. The album charted #44 in France.

Tracklisting
 Kraked Unit - "Munivers De Paris"
 Wax Tailor (feat. Charlotte Savary) - "Seize The Day"
 Artur Nunes - "Tia"
 Kraked Unit - "L'air Des Cendres"
 Rosemary Clooney - "Sway"
 Quincy Jones - "Comin' Home Baby"
 Philippe Katerine - "Louxor J'adore"
 Wilson Pickett - "Land of a Thousand Dances"
 Grant Phabao pres. Carlton Livingston and The Lone Ranger - "Running For My Life"
 Kraked Unit - "Douala Paris"
 Kraked Unit - "I Love Bidoche"
 Kraked Unit - "Ah Hum Babe"
 Adrag - "I don 't give a F..."
 Kraked Unit - "Les Fleurs Du Slam"
 Erik Satie - "Gnossienne N°1"

References

External links
  
 
 
 
 
 
 Allocine.fr article 
 Trailer with English subtitles

2008 films
Films directed by Cédric Klapisch
Films set in Paris
French comedy-drama films
2000s French-language films